Might and Power (6 October 1993 – 11 April 2020) was a New Zealand bred, Australian owned and trained Thoroughbred racehorse who was named Australian Horse of the Year in 1998 and 1999.  As a four-year-old, Might And Power won the Caulfield and Melbourne Cups, and returned at five to become only the second horse in the history of Australian racing to win both Cups and the Cox Plate.  He also won a number of other weight-for-age races in this period, including the Mercedes Classic, the AJC Queen Elizabeth Stakes, and the Doomben Cup.  A strong, free-striding front-runner, he broke course records in winning the Caulfield Cup, the Doomben Cup, and the Cox Plate, and won a number of races by big margins.

Breeding
Might and Power was foaled at Windsor Park Stud in New Zealand.  He was by Zabeel out of the Irish mare Benediction, whose 13 foals for nine winners also included the stakeswinners Matter Of Honour (by Casual Lies) and Bastet (by Giant's Causeway) and the city winners Scud (by Dance Floor) and Miss Priority (by Kaapstad).  In turn, Miss Priority (a three-quarter sister to Might And Power) produced the stakeswinners Miss Power Bird (by Mukaddamah) and Lucky Owners (by Danehill), who was a champion in Hong Kong.  Benediction was named New Zealand Broodmare of the Year in 1998 and 1999.

Racing career

Two- and three-year-old season: 1995-1997
Might and Power made his debut late in his two-year-old season, and won his first race on 24 July 1996, at his third start.  Spelled after one more start, he returned in the new year, and, once stepped up to 1,900 metres, won back-to-back restricted races at Canterbury.  Up in grade, he finished second to the multiple Group One winner Intergaze in the Canterbury Guineas, seventh in the Rosehill Guineas, and was defeated by just over a length when fourth in the AJC Derby after suffering severe interference.  Seven days later, as a short-priced favourite, he won the Frank Packer Plate by six lengths.

Four-year-old season: 1997-1998
Might And Power resumed in the Show County Quality, over 1,200 metres (6 furlongs) and came from near the tail of the field to defeat the Caulfield Guineas winner Alfa and the stakeswinning sprinter Armidale.  He then finished second to Galactic Valley in the Tramway Handicap and Quick Flick Shannon Quality and was beaten less than three lengths in the Epsom Handicap, but Brian York lost the ride to Jim Cassidy.  Stepping up from 1,600 to 2,400 metres for the Caulfield Cup, Cassidy rode Might And Power and allowed him to stride freely and at the home turn he was well clear of his opposition. In winning by the extraordinary margin of  lengths, he broke the course record.  The rest of the field was headed by the 1995 winner Doriemus.

After such an emphatic win, betting markets for the Cox Plate and the Melbourne Cup were hastily rearranged, with Might and Power being installed as a short-priced favourite for both events.  His trainer, Jack Denham, who had Filante set for the Cox Plate, elected to bypass the Valley feature with Might And Power and go into the Melbourne Cup without another run.  At Flemington, Might And Power was to carry 56 kilograms having received a penalty of three-and-a-half kilos (a modern record) for his win in the Caulfield Cup.  This placed him just one kilo below weight-for-age for a four-year-old male horse at 3,200 metres, and within 1.5 kilograms of Doriemus, who had won the race in 1995.  If Might And Power were successful, it would be the highest weight carried to victory by a four-year-old since Gurner's Lane in 1982.

Despite these obstacles, as well as several European stayers and tackling the extreme distance for the first time, several large bets were placed on Might And Power on the day of the race.  Starting favourite, he led, and withstood three distinct waves of challenges – Crying Game at the 1,600-metre point, Linesman on the home turn, and Doriemus over the final 200 metres.  After seeing off Linesman, Might and Power led by more than two lengths with 300 metres left to run, but Doriemus emerged on the outside.  Edging closer and closer, Doriemus appeared likely to score with 50 metres to go, but Might And Power found again in the final strides.  In the tightest of finishes, after which Greg Hall, on Doriemus, waved his whip in salute, the photo showed Might and Power had held on.

At the end of the year, Might and Power was named World Champion Stayer.

Returning in the new year, Might And Power ran third behind the Group One winning sprinters Special Dane and Al Mansour in Orr Stakes, but was beaten as favourite by the reigning Cox Plate winner, Dane Ripper, in the St George Stakes, and a minor injury forced him out of the Australian Cup (also won by Dane Ripper).  Back in Sydney, Might And Power ran second to the Australian Guineas winner Gold Guru in the Ranvet Stakes, but connections were unhappy with Jim Cassidy's ride, and Brian York  again took over.

Back to full fitness, and well-rated by York, Might And Power recorded fast time and defeated Gold Guru and Doriemus by five lengths in the Mercedes Classic.  This was the beginning of a patch of remarkable form, where he won four weight-for-age races in a row by a combined margin of more than 22 lengths.  At Randwick, three weeks later, Might and Power faced a field of six in the AJC Queen Elizabeth Stakes, which included the multiple Group One winners Juggler, Champagne, Catalan Opening, and Intergaze, but it was a one-act affair as he won by 10½ lengths.  Taken to Queensland, he defeated the Group One winner Summer Beau by 5¾ lengths in the Hollindale Cup, and beat Intergaze by just over a length and broke the course record in winning the Doomben Cup.

Five-year-old season: 1998-1999
Might And Power's winning run came to an end when beaten on a heavy track in the Warwick Stakes, but, stepped up to 1,600 metres, defeated Juggler second-up in Chelmsford Stakes.  Three weeks later, Might And Power started favourite in the George Main Stakes but faded badly in the straight.  The poor run resulted from a virus, and his spring campaign appeared to be in jeopardy.  Brian York was again replaced by Jim Cassidy, however, and the horse's campaign continued in Melbourne, in the Caulfield Stakes.  Shane Dye led on the multiple Group One winner Tycoon Lil, but Cassidy bided his time on Might And Power, in second place, and surged to the front over the closing stages to win by just over two lengths.

Back to top form, Might And Power was installed 11/8-on favourite (approximately $1.70) for the Cox Plate.  His trainer, Jack Denham, had been runner-up in the two previous editions, with Filante, and victory would give Might And Power a place in history.  He would become only the second horse, after Rising Fast in 1954, to win the Cox Plate and the Caulfield and Melbourne Cups, and the first reigning Melbourne Cup winner since Phar Lap in 1931 to win the Cox Plate.  As a result, nearly 40,000 racegoers packed Moonee Valley racecourse on 24 October 1998.  Heading down the straight for the first time, rival jockeys pressed through on the inside in an attempt to clutter him behind other horses, but Jim Cassidy swung Might And Power four-deep on the turn out of the straight, and took over down the side of the course.  Setting a strong pace, the rest of the field began to tire behind him, and Might And Power turned for home two lengths clear.  AJC Derby placegetter Northern Drake loomed up strongly, at 100/1, but Might And Power held on comfortably to win by just over a length in course record time.

Two weeks later, in what would prove the last win of his career, Might And Power beat a sub-standard field by seven lengths in the VRC Queen Elizabeth Stakes.  Owner Nick Moraitis was invited to run Might And Power in the Japan Cup but was unable to secure a direct flight, and elected to send the horse for a spell.

In the new year, Might And Power bowed a tendon in training, and was off the scene for 18 months.

Six- and seven-year-old season: 1999-2001
Unraced at six, Might And Power returned in September 2000 at age seven but failed to beat a runner home in his two starts and was quickly retired. He made numerous public appearances and resided at Living Legends in Woodlands Historic Park, Greenvale, Victoria.

Death
Might and Power died on 11 April 2020 after emergency surgery for colic.

Race record

Pedigree

See also
 Australian Champion Racehorse of the Year
 List of historical horses
 List of millionaire racehorses in Australia
 List of Melbourne Cup winners

References

Notes

Bibliography

External links
 Might and Power pedigree and partial racing stats
 Pictures of Might and Power
 A priceless photograph of Might and Power with tiny friend
 Australian Racing Hall of Fame

1993 racehorse births
Australian Champion Racehorse of the Year
Australian Racing Hall of Fame horses
Caulfield Cup winners
Cox Plate winners
Melbourne Cup winners
Racehorses bred in New Zealand
Racehorses trained in Australia
Thoroughbred family 6-e
2020 racehorse deaths